Carl-Henry Alström (3 May 1907 – 1993) was a Swedish psychiatrist who described a syndrome now named for him, Alström syndrome, a hereditary disorder that characteristically includes obesity in childhood, nerve deafness, and retinal degeneration (due to atypical retinitis pigmentosa).

External links
Carl-Henry Alström biographical sketch on Who Named It? site 
Alström Syndrome International

1907 births
1993 deaths
Swedish psychiatrists
20th-century Swedish physicians